Hemelein can refer to:
Hemelein Prima, an alternate name for Rho Boötis, a star in the northern constellation of Boötes
Hemelein Secunda, an alternate name for Sigma Boötis, a star in the northern constellation of Boötes